Ladozhsky (masculine), Ladozhskaya (feminine), or Ladozhskoye (neuter) may refer to:

Ladozhsky Rail Terminal, a rail terminal in St. Petersburg, Russia
Ladoga Canal (Ladozhsky Kanal), a water transport route in Leningrad Oblast, linking the Neva and the Svir Rivers
Ladozhskaya, a village (stanitsa) in Krasnodar Krai, Russia
Ladozhskoye, a village in Tver Oblast, Russia
Ladozhsky Seal